The Negrelli Viaduct (Czech: Negrelliho viadukt by Alois Negrelli, also known as the Karlín Viaduct,), Czech republic,  is a railway bridge over the Štvanice island that connects the Masaryk Railway Station in Prague with Bubny. It is historically the first Prague railway bridge over the Vltava and currently it is the second oldest Prague bridge over this river and  its thirteenth downstream bridge in the capital.

It is also the longest railway bridge and the third longest bridge in the Czech Republic.

The viaduct was declared a Czech cultural monument in 1964.

History

Construction 
The Karlín Viaduct was built as part of the Dresden branch of the Northern State Railways Olomouc-Prague-Dresden project, which was approved by the State Railways Directorate in 1842. The construction started in spring 1846, was completed in 1849 and the bridge was put into operation on 1 June 1850. The construction costs amounted to one and a half million florins. 

At that time the bridge had 87 stone arches, eight of which stood directly in the Vltava River. The railway line was double-tracked, in the second half of the 19th century a third shunting blind track has been laid. The current width is 110 meters. The width of the bridge deck between the stone railings is 7.6 m. The length is 1100 meters and until 1910 it was Europe's longest bridge.

The construction was to be entrusted to Jan Perner, who already led the construction of the line between Olomouc and Prague, but he unexpectedly died and Alois Negrelli  took over the bridgework.

The viaduct was built over  the then unregulated river. Granite, mined in the Schwarzenberg Quarry, which is now flooded with the Orlík Reservoir, was ferried from Kamýk nad Vltavou and processed on site.

The entire viaduct had vaults made of block masonry, Czech granite and pillar cladding were made of sandstone with granite blocks on the corners. The core of the masonry is made of quarry stone, the pillars are based on wooden gratings

Up to 3000 workers of different nationalities participated in the construction. For the first time, steam lifting machines were used to a greater extent.

Worldwide, it was a quite unique building, since in many places at that time similar bridges were built from wood and not from granite.

Operation and maintenance 
Later, houses were erected in close proximity to the bridge. With the growing industry, vacancies under its arches were filled with craft workshops and forwarding companies, mostly with built-in floors.

In 1871 the bridge was extended on the south side by the Karlín connecting viaduct to enable a direct connection between Bubny and Libeň.

By the end of the 19th century, critics pointed out that the bridge was an obstacle to the development and permeability of the city.

In 1952–1954, three bridge arches were demolished in the area of Křižíkova Street to improve the throughput of motor vehicles. The newly created gap was bridged over by beamed lintels made of pre-stressed concrete. In 1981 a similar intervention was carried out on the Holesovice side, above the Bubenske embankment.

The viaduct survived the August 2002 flood in full operation.

Reconstruction 2017–2021 
A major bridge reconstruction which started in 2017 is scheduled to be finished in 2021. The budgeted cost is 1,443 billion CZK (out of which  990 million CZK is funded by the European Union).

It addresses the unsatisfactory condition of the bridge structure, the railway superstructure, the signaling, communication and heavy-current equipment and the overhead lines. At the same time preserving an important cultural monument.

References

See also 

 Jan Fischer, Ondřej Fischer: Pražské mosty. Academia, Praha 1985, p. 29–34.

Bridges over the Vltava
Viaducts
Arch bridges
Bridges completed in 1850
Bridges in Prague
Stone bridges
Railway bridges in the Czech Republic
Prague 7